The following is a list of coaches who have coached the Carlton Football Club at a game of Australian rules football in the Australian Football League (AFL), formerly the VFL.

 Statistics are correct to round 23, 2022

Key: 
 P = Played
 W = Won
 L = Lost
 D = Drew
 W% = Win percentage

References
AFL Tables - Carlton - Coaches

Carlton Football Club coaches

Carlton Football Club coaches